Sir Edwin Geoffrey Johnson (born 11 May 1963) is a British High Court judge.

Personal life and education 
Johnson was born in Lincolnshire, England and grew up in Surrey; he was educated at Lancing College. He then attended Christ Church, Oxford where he completed a BA in jurisprudence in 1986.

In 1991, he married Mary Thorne and together they have two sons and a daughter.

Career 
He was called to the bar at Lincoln's Inn in 1987 and practised real property and professional negligence from Maitland Chambers. He took silk in 2006 and was appointed a deputy High Court judge in 2017. He was an editor of Snell's Equity thirty-first edition in 2005. As a practitioner, he appeared before the House of Lords.

On 1 October 2021, Johnson was appointed a judge of the High Court and assigned to the Chancery Division. He received the customary knighthood in the same year. He was appointed President of the Upper Tribunal (Lands Chamber) on 1 August 2022.

References 

Living people
1963 births
21st-century English judges
Knights Bachelor
Alumni of Christ Church, Oxford
Members of Lincoln's Inn
Chancery Division judges
People educated at Lancing College
People from Lincolnshire
English King's Counsel
21st-century King's Counsel